Spoilage, spoiling or (making something) spoiled may refer to:
 Spoiled child, a derogatory term aimed at children who exhibit behavioral problems from being overindulged by their parents.
Decomposition, the process by which organic substances are broken down into simpler matter.
 Food spoilage, the process in which food deteriorates to the point in which it is not edible to humans or its quality of edibility becomes reduced
 Spoiling of a gradient echo magnetic resonance sequence
 Spoiled (play), a television and stage play
 "Spoiled" (song), a 2005 song by Joss Stone
"Spoiled", a song by Basement from their 2012 album Colourmeinkindness

See also 
 Decay (disambiguation)
 Decomposition (disambiguation)
 Spoil (disambiguation)